WAUB (1590 AM) is a commercial radio station licensed to Auburn, New York. The station is part of the Finger Lakes Radio Group, and is owned by Auburn Broadcasting, Inc.  WAUB simulcasts a talk radio format with co-owned WGVA (1240 AM) in Geneva.

By day, WAUB is powered at 450 watts. At night, power increase to 1,000 watts. WAUB uses a directional antenna at all times to protect other stations on 1590 AM. Programming is also heard on 250 watt FM translator 96.3 W242DC in Auburn.

Programming
Weekdays begin with a news and information show hosted by Ted Baker.  The rest of the weekday schedule is mostly nationally syndicated talk shows from Brian Kilmeade, Dave Ramsey, Mark Levin, Ben Shapiro, Jared Dillian, Jim Bohannon and Coast to Coast AM with George Noory.  Weekends feature shows on money, health, the outdoors, home improvement, science, law, cars, travel and gardening.  Weekend hosts include Rudy Maxa, Dr. Michio Kaku and Lee Habeeb.

WAUB and WGVA carry Syracuse Orangemen football and Buffalo Bills NFL football.  Most hours begin with world and national news from CBS Radio News.

History
On Christmas Eve, 1959, WAUB first signed on the air.  It began as a 500 watt daytimer station, required to go off the air at sunset.  It was owned by the Atom Broadcasting Company.

References

External links

AUB
Radio stations established in 1959
1959 establishments in New York (state)
News and talk radio stations in the United States